Michelle Denise Hawkins is an American atmospheric scientist and chief of the severe, fire, public and winter weather services branch at the United States National Weather Service.

Early life and education 
Hawkins grew up in Chicago. She earned her bachelors of sciences in chemistry and PhD in atmospheric science from Howard University.

Career 
In her role at the National Weather Service, Hawkins leads programs and policies related to severe, public, and winter weather services, as well as weather-support response services for wildland fires in support of National Weather Service land management partners. In 2014 she worked with undergraduates at Howard University in a campaign designed to expand publicly-available information about summertime weather, and in 2016 she talked with The Daily Beast about heat domes and increasing awareness of weather-related issues. Her work includes issuing high heat warnings, and considerations of optimal timing for such warnings. 

In 2022, Hawkins was named a fellow of the White House Leadership Development Program, and she is assigned to the Council on Environmental Quality.

Selected publications

Awards and honors 
In 2019 Hawkins was named a "Modern Day Technology Leader" at the Black Engineer of the Year Awards.

Personal life 
Hawkins is a mother; she lives in Maryland.

References

External links 
Michelle Hawkins, Enhanced features of the text-based NWS Severe Thunderstorm Warning, Runnels County Register, 2021

Living people
Year of birth missing (living people)
Howard University alumni
American meteorologists
People from Chicago
National Weather Service people
American women scientists